Bernstein Litowitz Berger & Grossmann (BLB&G) is an American plaintiffs' law firm headquartered in New York City. The law firm was founded in 1983. 

Throughout the nine years from 2013 to 2021, Bernstein Litowitz Berger & Grossmann finished first or second every year in the value of settlement totals it achieved for the investors it represented in court, as measured from the 50 largest securities class action settlements in the United States in each year; as of May 2022, when examining the most current two years (2020 and 2021) of data, BLB&G achieved a two year total of $1.38 billion in settlements, as reported by the advisory firm Institutional Shareholder Services (ISS). In the 2021 ISS report, the managing director of ISS Securities Class Action Services stated that, with every legal victory, the law firm "deepens their relationships with the state, local and union pension funds that are often appointed to lead the biggest shareholder class actions."

References

External links
 

Privately held companies of the United States
Law firms based in New York City
Law firms established in 1983